Joseph Johnson may refer to:

Entertainment
Joseph McMillan Johnson (1912–1990), American film art director
Smokey Johnson (1936–2015), New Orleans jazz musician
N.O. Joe (Joseph Johnson, born 1975), American musician, producer and songwriter

Politics
Joseph Johnson (South Carolina mayor) (1776–1862), mayor of Charleston, South Carolina, United States
Joseph Johnson (Virginia politician) (1785–1877), U.S. Representative and Governor of Virginia
Frank Johnson (politician) (Joseph Colin Francis Johnson, 1848–1904), journalist and politician in South Australia, Minister of Education 1887 to 1889
Joseph Johnson (FDNY Commissioner) (1871–1941), American fire department commissioner
Joseph B. Johnson (1893–1986), Governor of Vermont
Joseph B. Johnson (Wisconsin politician) (1837–1913), American farmer-politician from Wisconsin
Joseph E. Johnson (government official) (1906–1990), American government official with the United States Department of State and the United Nations
Joseph P. Johnson (1931-2022), Virginia state delegate
Joseph T. Johnson (1858–1919), U.S. Representative from South Carolina and U.S. federal judge
J. M. Johnson (Joseph Modupe Johnson, 1911–1987), Nigerian politician
Joseph L. Johnson (1874–1945), United States Ambassador to Liberia
Joseph A. Johnson (1917–2007), American politician in the Virginia House of Delegates
Jo Johnson (Joseph Edmund Johnson, born 1971), British Conservative politician, former MP for Orpington and life peer in the House of Lords

Religion
Joseph E. Johnson (Mormon) (1817–1882), American newspaper publisher and Mormon pioneer
Billy Johnson (Mormon) (Joseph William Billy Johnson, 1934–2012), leader and Mormon missionary in Ghana
Joseph Horsfall Johnson (1847–1928), Episcopal bishop of Los Angeles
Joseph A. Johnson Jr. (1914–1979), African-American theologian; bishop of the Christian Methodist Episcopal Church in Mississippi and Louisiana

Sports
Joseph Johnson (cricketer) (1916–2011), English cricketer
Joseph Johnson (field hockey) (born 1945), Malaysian Olympic hockey player
Joseph Johnson (footballer, born 1903), English footballer for Scunthorpe and Bradford City
Joseph Johnson (footballer, born in Felling) (fl. 1914–1921), English footballer for Sunderland
Joseph Johnson (figure skater) (born 1994), American ice dancer
Charles Leroux (Joseph Johnson, 1856–1889), American balloonist and parachutist

Others
Joseph Johnson (publisher) (1738–1809), London bookseller
Joseph Johnson (watch maker) (1780–1851), watchmaker from Liverpool
Joseph Forsyth Johnson (1840–1906), English landscape architect
Joseph French Johnson (1853–1925), American economist
Joseph I. Johnson (1914–1940), World War II Royal Air Force aviator
Joseph Johnson (murderer) (died 1964), American murderer executed by the state of Texas
Joseph Johnson (chef) (born 1984), American chef
Joseph E. Johnson (academic) (born 1933), president of University of Tennessee
Joseph Johnson III (1940–2017), American physicist

See also
Joe Johnson (disambiguation)
Joseph Johnston (disambiguation)